The 1955 Missouri Valley Vikings football team represented Missouri Valley College as a member of the Missouri College Athletic Union (MCAU) during the 1955 college football season. Led by 16th-year head coach Volney Ashford, the Vikings compiled an overall record of 9–1–1 with a mark of 1–0 in conference play, winning the MCAU title. Missouri Valley was invited to the Mineral Water Bowl, where they defeated , and the Tangerine Bowl, where they tied .

Schedule

References

Missouri Valley
Missouri Valley Vikings football seasons
Missouri Valley Vikings football